Pa Dad is a tambon (subdistrict) of Mueang Chiang Mai District, in Chiang Mai Province, Thailand. In 2009 it had a population of 16,859 people.

The subdistrict is south of the city of Chiang Mai, on a branch of the Ping River. The Muang Chiang Mai Wetland is on this river in the subdistrict.

Administration
The tambon is divided into 13 administrative villages (mubans).

A small part of the subdistrict is in the city of Chiang Mai; most of the area belongs to the subdistrict municipality (thesaban tambon) Pa Daet.

History
The part of the subdistrict not belonging to the city Chiang Mai became administered by a tambon administrative organization (TAO) in 1995. In 2007 it was upgraded to a subdistrict municipality.

References

External links
 Pa Daet municipality

Tambon of Chiang Mai province
Populated places in Chiang Mai province